The 2017–18 Cincinnati Bearcats women's basketball team will represent the University of Cincinnati during the 2017–18 NCAA Division I women's basketball season. The season marks the fifth for the Bearcats as members of the American Athletic Conference. The Bearcats, led by ninth year head coach Jamelle Elliott, will play their home games at St. Ursula Academy Gymnasium while their normal on-campus home of Fifth Third Arena is closed for renovation. They finished the season 19–13, 10–6 in AAC play to finish in fourth place. They advanced to the semifinals of the American Athletic women's tournament where they lost to Connecticut. They received an at-large bid Women's National Invitation Tournament where they lost in the first round to Michigan State.

Cincinnati announced on March 21 that Elliott would not return after 9 seasons as head coach. She finish at Cincinnati with a 9-year record of 113–162.

Media
All games will have a video stream on Bearcats TV, ESPN3, or AAC Digital Network

Offseason

Departing players

2017 Recruits

Roster

Schedule and results

|-
!colspan=12 style=""| Exhibition

|-
!colspan=12 style=""| Non-conference regular season

|-
!colspan=12 style=""| AAC regular season

|-
!colspan=12 style=""| AAC Women's Tournament

|-
!colspan=12 style=""| WNIT

See also
 2017–18 Cincinnati Bearcats men's basketball team

References

External links
Official website

Cincinnati
Cincinnati Bearcats women's basketball seasons
Cincinnati